A Manifesto for Labour Law: towards a comprehensive revision of workers’ rights (Institute of Employment Rights, 2016) is a set of reform proposals for UK labour law, written by fifteen labour rights experts in academia and legal practice from the UK, Europe and the Commonwealth. It is edited by Keith D. Ewing, John Hendy QC and Carolyn Jones. The Manifesto urges that to stop low productivity, rising inequality, stagnant low wages, and poor working conditions, there should be a shift toward sectoral collective bargaining, worker voice in corporate governance, and a renewed Ministry of Labour with power to support democracy at work. In full, it lists 25 recommendations for reform.

Contents 
Chapter one - introduction
Chapter two - the four pillars of collective bargaining
Chapter three - making collective bargaining work
Chapter four - improving statutory protection
Chapter five - making rights work
Chapter six - securing freedom of association
Chapter seven - enhancing the right to strike
Chapter eight - conclusion
Principal recommendations

Significance
The ‘’Manifesto’’ has been reviewed in multiple blogs and journals, endorsed by trade unions, and adopted by the opposition Labour Party.

See also
United Kingdom labour law
European labour law
United States labor law

Notes

References
E McGaughey, ‘Twelve Point Plan for Labour, and A Manifesto for Labour Law’ (2017) 46(1) Industrial Law Journal 169
International Centre for Trade Union Rights

External links
Manifesto on IER website

Law reform in the United Kingdom
United Kingdom labour case law